The Manila Sporting Club, also known as All Manila, was an association football club based in Manila, Philippines. It was one of the first clubs in the country, and won the first Philippines Championship in 1911.

Honours 
Philippines Championship: 1
 1911

References

Football clubs in the Philippines
Sports teams in Metro Manila